Stone Town also known as Mji Mkongwe is the old part of the Zanzibar City. The Town was the capital of the Sultanate of Zanzibar and at one point the capital of the Sultanate of Muscat and Oman. The town's architecture and cultural composition is a mixture of centuries of various cultures that have inhabited the island such as the Arabs, Persians, Indias and Europeans. The site was declared a UNESCO world heritage site in 2000 and is a major tourist site in the nation of Tanzania.

Historic Buildings

Other Iconic Landmarks

See also 

List of World Heritage Sites in Tanzania

References

External links 

Swahili city-states
Stone Town
Stone Town landmarks